Waterford High School may refer to:

United States
Waterford High School (California), Waterford, California
Waterford High School (Connecticut), Waterford, Connecticut
Waterford High School (Ohio), Waterford, Ohio
Waterford Kettering High School, Waterford, Michigan
Waterford Mott High School, Waterford, Michigan
Waterford Union High School, Waterford, Wisconsin

Elsewhere
Waterford District High School in Waterford, Ontario, Canada